Antizyme inhibitor 2 (AzI2) also erroneously known as  arginine decarboxylase (ADC) is a protein that in humans is encoded by the AZIN2 gene. In contrast to initial suggestions, Antizyme inhibitor 2 does not act as arginine decarboxylase (ADC) in mammalian cells

References

Further reading

External links